The following list is of buildings and structures in Hong Kong that have been demolished or destroyed. Buildings are arranged by the historical period in which they were constructed.

First British era (1841-1945)

Second British era (1945-1997)

See also 

 Architecture of Hong Kong
 Heritage conservation in Hong Kong
 List of buildings and structures in Hong Kong
 List of the oldest buildings and structures in Hong Kong

References 

Culture of Hong Kong
History of Hong Kong
Hong Kong

Architecture by city
Architecture in Hong Kong